Adam Tsuei (born 26 October 1959) is an entrepreneur, film producer, and director. He was the former president of Sony Music Entertainment in the Greater China Region. He has made and brought to the music world super idols as Jay Chou, Leehom Wang, F4 and Jolin Tsai, which made him been viewed as one of the most powerful masters behind the scene in entertainment industry. In 2011, he successfully marketed the film You Are the Apple of My Eye, a movie featuring a love story within a group of boys and a girl, which made a great hit among all Chinese-speaking countries. Decided to dedicating to movie industry, Tsuei founded Amazing Film Studio in 2012 and served as CEO. In 2013, by putting effort into producing, marketing and distributing, he presented the film Tiny Times and Tiny Times 2. Both of them quickly becomes the hottest topics among mainland China, Taiwan and Hong Kong. In 2014, with the same legend combination of Angie Chai and Giddens Ko, he presented Café. Waiting. Love, a romantic comedy with color of fantasy inside. In the future of 2016, as a director and producer, Tsuei is going to present the film “The Tenants Downstairs”, adapted by Giddens Ko’s original novel. There will be a film with black humor, fantasy, mystery and thriller in. With the experience of being a professional manager in global enterprise for decades, Tsuei is aimed for building a total entertainment company for Greater China, including movie’s production, movie’s promotion, VFX, artist agency, music production and concert production.

Career
JAN 2012–Present Amazing Film Studio, Founder & CEO

JUL 2001 - OCT 2011 Sony Music Entertainment, President, Greater China

JUL 1997 - JUN 2001   BMG Music Entertainment, Managing Director, Pan China Region

DEC 1994 - JUN 1997 CTN, Chinese Television Network, Marketing Director

Filmography
You Are the Apple of My Eye, Executive Producer

You Are the Apple of My Eye is a 2011 Taiwanese Romance film. It is based on the semi-autobiographical novel The Girl We Chased Together in Those Years by Taiwanese author Giddens Ko, who also made his directorial debut with the film. The film stars Ko Chen-tung as Ko Ching-teng, a prankster and a mischievous student who eventually becomes a writer. Michelle Chen stars as Shen Chia-yi, an honor student who is very popular amongst the boys in her class. The film's world premiere was at the 13th Taipei Film Festival on 25 June 2011, and it was subsequently released in Taiwanese cinemas on 19 August. Well received by film critics, the movie set box-office records in Taiwan, Hong Kong, and Singapore. Ko Chen-tung won the Best Newcomer award at the Golden Horse Awards for his role in the film.

Tiny Times, Film Producer

Tiny Times is a 2013 Chinese romance drama film written and directed by Guo Jingming and based on the best-selling novel of the same name also by Guo. The story follows the film's narrator and protagonist Lin Xiao, played by Yang Mi, along with her best friends Gu Li, Nan Xiang, Tang Wanru, as they navigate between relationships, work and friendship in Shanghai.
The film received mostly negative reviews from Chinese film critics, although it was a commercial success. A sequel titled Tiny Times 2, which was filmed together with the first film and based on the second half of the novel, was released on August 8, 2013. Tiny Times 3, the third installment of the Tiny Times series was released on July 17, 2014.

Café. Waiting. Love, Film Producer

Café. Waiting. Love is a 2014 Taiwanese romantic comedy film directed by Chiang Chin-lin. It was based on Gidden Ko's original novel. By reaching the box office to NTD 440 million dollars, this film is the second place in box office in 2014 for domestically-made movies.Café. Waiting. Love was nominated for Best Film From Mainland and Taiwan of 33rd Hong Kong Film Awards. The original songs sung by Harlem Yu and Shennio Lin have been viewed over 25 million times.

The Tenants Downstairs, Director

The Tenants Downstairs is a Taiwanese black humor, fantasy, mystery and thriller film, directed by Adam Tsuei, planned to come out in 2016. The story is about a man inherited an old apartment and decided to land it to tenants who have different kind of strange additions. By setting the pinhole cameras in the apartment, he enjoys the pleasure of peeping people and discovering their secrets. However, the story within those tenants and the landlord are becoming more and more crazy and complicating..This film has got the Audience Award from Taipei Film Festival as the opening film for Taipei Film Festival, the closing film for New York Asian Film Festival, the audience award for Razor Reel Flanders Film Festival, and been nominated in L'Étrange Film Festival and Bucheon International Fantastic Film Festival The film's box office is $4.3 Million, which is ranking No.2 Taiwanese film in Taiwan's market.

Concerts
2010   Joanna Wang “The Adult’s Book” concert
2010 Rainie Yang “Whimsical World” concert
2008 Sony Multi-Artists “Dare to Be Different” concert
2006 Leehom Wang “The Hero” concert
2006 F4  “Forever 4” concert in Hong Kong
2004 Jolin Tsai "J1 World Tour"
2001 F4 Music Party
1997 BMG 10th Anniversary concert

Artists
Leehom Wang
Jay Chou
F4
Harlem Yu
Jolin Tsai
Rainie Yang
Joanna Wang
Faye Wong
Karen Mok
Desert Xuan
Andy Lau
Leon Lai
Jordan Chan
Jacky Wu
Julia Peng
Vivian Hsu
Lin Yu Chung

References

1959 births
Living people
Chinese chief executives
Chinese film directors
Chinese film producers
National Taiwan University alumni
Sony people
Tunghai University alumni
University of California, Riverside alumni